Cloch or Cloch Point  is a point on the coast of the Firth of Clyde, Scotland. There has been a lighthouse since 1797 to warn ships off The Gantocks.

Location
Cloch Point lies on the A770, north of Inverkip, three miles south-west of Gourock, on the east shore of the Firth of Clyde, directly opposite Dunoon.

Lighthouse
The Cloch Lighthouse was designed by Thomas Smith and his son-in-law Robert Stevenson. The building was completed in 1797. There appear to be two generations of keepers' houses, the older now used as stores and the more recent having crow-stepped gables. The short circular-section tower has a corbelled walkway and triangular windows. The foghorns were added between 1895 and 1897.

The light was built by John Clarkson (engineer); Kermack and Gall built the tower, while Smith and Stevenson installed the oil lantern which was first lit on 11 August 1797. The light was replaced in 1829 with an argand lamp and silvered reflector. About 1900, it was lit with acetylene. A radio beacon was installed about 1931.

The dioptric and catadioptric lenses floated in baths of mercury and were rotated by a clockwork mechanism powered by falling weights. As well as tending the light, the keepers had to wind the mechanism by hand every two to three hours.

Today, the light is fully automated and unmanned. The main light has been replaced by a light on a pole outside the lantern room.

See also 
 List of listed buildings in Inverkip, Inverclyde

References

Further reading 

 

Category B listed lighthouses
Category B listed buildings in Inverclyde
Firth of Clyde
Gourock